Mark Van Dyke Holmes (born 1960) is an American lawyer who serves as a senior judge of the United States Tax Court.

Career 

He earned a Bachelor of Arts from Harvard College in 1979 and his Juris Doctor from the University of Chicago Law School in 1983.

After graduating from law school, Holmes clerked for Judge Alex Kozinski of the United States Court of Appeals for the Ninth Circuit, worked for Cahill Gordon & Reindel, Sullivan & Cromwell, and Miller & Chevalier, served as counsel to the chairman of the United States International Trade Commission, and spent two years as a deputy assistant attorney general in the United States Department of Justice Tax Division.

He was appointed by President George W. Bush to be a judge of the United States Tax Court on June 30, 2003, for a term ending June 29, 2018. He is known for writing colorful, engaging opinions on tax matters.

On April 24, 2018, President Donald Trump nominated him for another 15-year term on the court. On February 6, 2019, his re-nomination was sent to the Senate. On January 3, 2020, his nomination was returned to the President under Rule XXXI, Paragraph 6 of the United States Senate.

On December 10, 2020, his nomination was sent to the Senate. President Trump nominated Holmes for reappointment to the Tax Court. On January 3, 2021, his nomination was returned to the President under Rule XXXI, Paragraph 6 of the United States Senate. Later that same day, his renomination was sent to the Senate. His nomination was withdrawn on February 4, 2021.

Organizational memberships 
 American Bar Association (Litigation and Tax Sections)
 New York and District of Columbia Bars
 Federalist Society

References

External links 
 Biography at U.S. Tax Court
 Biography at Ballotpedia

1960 births
Living people
20th-century American lawyers
21st-century American lawyers
21st-century American judges
Federalist Society members
Harvard College alumni
Judges of the United States Tax Court
Sullivan & Cromwell people
United States Article I federal judges appointed by George W. Bush

United States Department of Justice lawyers
University of Chicago Law School alumni
People associated with Cahill Gordon & Reindel